Panna district is a district of the Sagar Division, within the Madhya Pradesh state in central India. The town of Panna is the district headquarters.

History

Panna district was created in 1950, shortly after Indian independence, from the territory of several former princely states of British India, including the states of Panna, Jaso, most of Ajaigarh, and a portion of Paldeo. Panna District was part of the new Indian state of Vindhya Pradesh, which was merged into Madhya Pradesh on 1 November 1956.

Geography
It has an area of 7,135 km2.

The Ken River flows through the district. The Pandav Falls and the Gatha Falls are located in the district. Panna National Park is a major tourist attraction in the district.

Economy
In 2006 the Ministry of Panchayati Raj named Panna one of the country's 250 most backward districts (out of a total of 640). It is one of the 24 districts in Madhya Pradesh currently receiving funds from the Backward Regions Grant Fund Programme (BRGF). It is among the five poorest districts in the state in terms of income. It ranks 41st out of 45 districts in human development index (HDI) in Madhya Pradesh.

Divisions

Gram panchayats under Panna district 
This intermediate subdivisions are also called block, intermediate panchayat, tehsil or tahsil. Inside Panna district, there are the following nine subdivisions:
 Ajaigarh
 Amanganj
 Gunour (or Gunnor, or Gunor as panchayat and habitation name or Gunaur as village name)
 Panna
 Pawai
 Shahnagar
 Raipura
Simariya
Devendra Nagar

Demographics

According to the 2011 census Panna District has a population of 1,016,520, roughly equal to the nation of Cyprus or the US state of Montana. This gives it a ranking of 442nd in India (out of a total of 640). Its population growth rate over the decade 2001–2011 was 18.62%. Panna has a sex ratio of 907 females for every 1000 males, and a literacy rate of 66.08%. 12.33% of the population lives in urban areas. Scheduled Castes and Tribes made up 20.46% and 16.81% of the population respectively.

Languages

At the time of the 2011 Census of India, 69.08% of the population in the district spoke Hindi and 29.73% Bundeli as their first language.

Among Panna's languages is Bundeli, which has a lexical similarity of 72–91% with Hindi and is spoken by about 3 million people in Bagelkhand.

Mining 
Panna district is famous for its diamond mines located in a belt of about 80 km across the Panna town. In olden days the most productive mines were located in the village of Sukariuh. Nowadays, Majhagaon is the only active diamond mine in Asia.

Villages 
 

Jaruapur

References

External links

 Official website

 
Districts of Madhya Pradesh. 

Famous personalities 

Nidhi khare – Author